"I Think I'll Just Stay Here and Drink" is a song written and recorded by American country music artist Merle Haggard.  It was released in October 1980 as the second single from the album Back to the Barrooms. The song was Haggard's twenty-sixth No. 1 country hit, and stayed at the top position for one week and spent a total of twelve weeks on the country chart. It features a memorable saxophone solo by Don Markham of The Strangers. The song was covered by Warrant on their 2017 album Louder Harder Faster.

Chart performance

References

1980 singles
Merle Haggard songs
Warrant (American band) songs
Songs written by Merle Haggard
Song recordings produced by Jimmy Bowen
Songs about alcohol
MCA Records singles
2017 singles
1980 songs